This is a list of Primitive Baptist churches that are notable.
In the United States, these include:
Abbott's Creek Primitive Baptist Church, Thomasville, NC
Bear Grass Primitive Baptist Church, Bear Grass, NC
Beards Creek Primitive Baptist Church, Glennville, GA
Beesley Primitive Baptist Church, Murfreesboro, TN
Cane Springs Primitive Baptist Church, College Hill, KY
Goshen Primitive Baptist Church, Winchester, KY
Hannah's Creek Primitive Baptist Church, Benson, NC
Kehukee Primitive Baptist Church, Scotland Neck, NC
Mount Zion Old School Baptist Church, Aldie, VA
Primitive Baptist Church, Nashville, TN
Primitive Baptist Church of Brookfield, Slate Hill, NY
Providence Primitive Baptist Church, Walter Hill, TN
Red Banks Primitive Baptist Church, Bell Fork, NC
Republican Primitive Baptist Church, Haywood County, TN
Robersonville Primitive Baptist Church, Robersonville, NC
St. Thomas Primitive Baptist Church, Summit, OK
Shady Grove Primitive Baptist Church, Gainesville, FL
Shiloh Primitive Baptist Church, Brogden, NC
Skewarkey Primitive Baptist Church, Williamston, NC
Smithwick's Creek Primitive Baptist Church, Farmlife, Martin County, NC
Spring Green Primitive Baptist Church, Hamilton, NC
Wheelers Primitive Baptist Church, Person County, NC

See also
List of Baptist churches

References

Primitive Baptist
Primitive Baptist
Primitive Baptists